The Akaflieg Berlin B6 was a glider built in Germany in the late 1930s. It featured a high-wing, cantilevered mid-wing sailplane configuration with Junkers-flaps, retractable landing gear, all moving tail, dive air brakes, wood and steel body.

Specifications (B6)

See also
List of gliders

References

1930s German sailplanes
Akaflieg Berlin aircraft
Aircraft first flown in 1938